Kevin John Mulvey (born May 26, 1985) is an American former Major League Baseball (MLB) pitcher who played for the Minnesota Twins and Arizona Diamondbacks in 2009 and 2010, and is the current head baseball coach at Villanova University.

Early life
Mulvey is a New Jersey native. He graduated from Bishop George Ahr High School in Edison, New Jersey. Mulvey attended Villanova University, and in 2004 and 2005, he played collegiate summer baseball with the Harwich Mariners of the Cape Cod Baseball League. While at Villanova, he tossed a no-hitter against Connecticut on March 26, .

Professional

New York Mets
Mulvey was selected by the New York Mets in the second round (62nd overall) of the 2006 amateur draft. He made his professional debut in the Rookie League with the GCL Mets August 19, 2006. A day later, he was promoted to the Binghamton Mets, New York's Eastern League Double-A affiliate.

In , he went 11–10 with a 3.32 ERA for the Binghamton Mets and was selected to the All-Star Futures Game. In August 2007, he was promoted to the New Orleans Zephyrs of the Pacific Coast League. In two starts Kevin Mulvey got two wins without an earned run.

Minnesota Twins
Mulvey was one of the players included in the Johan Santana trade between the Mets and Twins on January 29, 2008. The other three players the Mets sent to the Twins were pitchers Philip Humber, Deolis Guerra and outfielder Carlos Gómez. At the time of the trade, Baseball America ranked Guerra, Gomez, Mulvey and Humber the second, third, fourth and seventh best prospects in the Mets organization, respectively.

Arizona Diamondbacks
On September 1, 2009, Mulvey was claimed off waivers to the Arizona Diamondbacks. The Arizona Diamondbacks sent cash considerations to the Twins. This claim was made shortly after a trade that sent pitcher Jon Rauch to the Twins for a player to be named later, which later became cash considerations. According to MLB.com "essentially that (the player to be named later) is Mulvey." He was designated for assignment on August 16, 2011.

The Diamondbacks released Mulvey on February 29, 2012.

New York Mets (second stint)
The Mets signed Mulvey to a minor league contract on March 10, 2012. They assigned him to the Class AA Binghamton Mets.

On May 26, Mulvey retired. Mulvey was 0–1 with a 5.59 ERA in 13 games with Binghamton.

Coaching career
On July 14, 2016, Mulvey was named the 11th head coach in Villanova Wildcats baseball history.

Head coaching record

References

External links

1985 births
Living people
Arizona Diamondbacks players
Arizona League Diamondbacks players
Baseball players from New Jersey
Binghamton Mets players
St. Thomas Aquinas High School (New Jersey) alumni
Bravos de Margarita players
American expatriate baseball players in Venezuela
Gulf Coast Mets players
Harwich Mariners players
Major League Baseball pitchers
Mesa Solar Sox players
Minnesota Twins players
New Orleans Zephyrs players
People from Sayreville, New Jersey
Reno Aces players
Rochester Red Wings players
Sportspeople from Middlesex County, New Jersey
Villanova Wildcats baseball players
Villanova Wildcats baseball coaches